Midway High Lakes Area, also known as High Lakes Area, is a United States Forest Service–designated area located in Washington’s Cascade Mountains. It lies on a high plateau on Mount Adams' northwestern flank. It is between the Goat Rocks on the north and Mount Hood to the south and contains Takhlakh Lake along with several other lakes. The area offers five scenic high elevation lakes all within a  radius. It is administered by the Gifford Pinchot National Forest. While even the most visited areas at Mount Adams pale in comparison to nearby St. Helens or Rainier, it is by its own standards one of the most popular recreational areas around Mount Adams. Some of the lakes offers photogenic views of Mount Adams from across the lake.

Geography

The Midway High Lakes Area lies below the volcanic peak of  Mount Adams, and Adams Glacier cascading from the summit in a series of icefalls. It is the second largest glacier in the State of Washington, after Carbon Glacier on Mount Rainier. There are some meadows and marshes, with Takh Takh Meadows being the most well known. Muddy Meadows is another named meadow in the High Lakes Area, near Riley Horse Camp and Muddy Meadows Trail accessing the Pacific Crest Trail and the Mount Adams Wilderness.

Major lakes
The table below lists the five major lakes within the Midway High Lakes Area.

Recreation

The High Lakes Area includes several lakes offering hiking, backpacking, fishing, non-motorized boating and canoeing, scenic driving, and developed and primitive camping experiences. The area offers several campgrounds including the popular Takhlakh Lake Campground. Other campgrounds are Olallie Lake Campground, Horseshoe Lake Campground, Killen Creek Campground, Council Lake Campground, Chain of Lakes Campground, Cat Creek Campground, Twin Falls Campground, and Adams Fork Campground. The popular and developed Walupt Lake Campground is also nearby, northeast of the Midway High Lakes Area at the southwestern base of the Goat Rocks. The area is the highlight of the  High Lakes Loop, a scenic driving loop in the White Pass National Scenic Byway beginning at Randle.

There are several waterfalls nearby, including Twin Falls, Steamboat Falls, Babyshoe Falls, Big Spring Creek Falls, and Riley Creek Falls.

In media 
 In 1989, National Geographic featured a photograph showing vacationers playing at Takhlakh Lake. The photo was taken by James P. Blair for, but not published in, "Old Growth Forests: Will We Save Our Own?," September 1990, National Geographic magazine) 
 In 2013, National Geographic featured Takhklakh Lake in a photograph titled: "Mount Adams reflected in Takhlakh Lake". It was one of the twenty places in the world chosen for National Geographic Must-Do Trips, called "Ultimate Adventure Bucket List 2013". The post was entitled as "Must-Do Trip: Hike Around Mount Adams, Washington". The photo was taken by Randall J. Hodges, from Getty Images. In it, she recommends the  circumnavigation of Mount Adams on a route hiking on several trails: the Highline, the Round the Mountain, and others (such as a portion of the Pacific Crest Trail); and includes some off-trail hiking at the east side of the mountain.

Gallery

See also 
 Gifford Pinchot National Forest
 List of lakes in Washington (state)
 Mount Adams

References

 
Gifford Pinchot National Forest
Lakes of Washington (state)
Lakes of Lewis County, Washington
Mount Adams (Washington)
Protected areas of Lewis County, Washington
Protected areas of Skamania County, Washington
Roadside attractions in Washington (state)